Malek Kian (also Romanized as Malek Kīān, Malek Keyān, Maliakian, and Malyakan) is a city in the Central District of Tabriz County, East Azerbaijan Province, Iran.  At the 2006 census, its population was 1,066, in 269 families.

References

Populated places in Tabriz County

Cities in East Azerbaijan Province